The Mangral (alternately Mahngral, "Mungral", Mangarpal) is a Rajput caste, some of whom were the historical founders and rulers of Kotli and Poonch. Their ancestor Raja Mangar Pal was the founder of the city of Nangi in modern Azad Kashmir. The Mangrals ruled Kotli State until 1815, and ruled Poonch State until 1819, following which both of these states were incorporated into the state of Jammu.

References

Sources
 A Hand Book on Azad Jammu & Kashmir, Pirzada Irshad Ahmad. Nawab Sons Publication, 2003

Punjabi tribes
Social groups of Azad Kashmir
Social groups of Pakistan
Tribes of Rawalpindi District